The 2009–10 BFA Senior League is the third season of the league playing under its present format, which involves the top teams from the Grand Bahama and New Providence Soccer Leagues. Previously, the league was a tournament between the top teams of each island, but is now the top flight of Bahamian football.

The competition features the winners of the New Providence Football League and the Grand Bahamas Football League to determine the top club in The Bahamas, as well as the nation's qualifier for the CFU Club Championship.

IM Bears FC won the championship, failing to win only one match in the process.

Teams

Table

References

External links
BFA Senior League via FIFA.com

BFA Senior League seasons
Bahamas
BFA Senior League
BFA Senior League